Satureja montana (winter savory or mountain savory), is a perennial, semi-evergreen herb in the family Lamiaceae, native to warm temperate regions of southern Europe, the Mediterranean, and Africa. It has dark green leaves and summer flowers ranging from pale lavender, or pink to white. The closely related summer savory (Satureja hortensis L.) is an annual plant.

Description
The leathery, dark green leaves are opposite, oval-lanceolate or needle-like,  1–2 cm long and 5 mm broad. The flowers appear in summer, between July and October, and range from pale lavender or pink to white. The flowers are smaller than summer savoury flowers. It contains carvacrol, a monoterpenoid phenol.

The herb was first published by Carl Linnaeus in his book Species Plantarum on page 568 in 1753. The Latin specific epithet montana refers to mountains or coming from mountains, leading to the common name 'mountain savory'.

Distribution and habitat
Satureja montana is native to temperate areas between Europe, the Mediterranean, and Africa.
It has been naturalised in Great Britain. It can be found growing in old walls, on dry banks and rocks on hillsides, or rocky mountain slopes, usually on calcareous or alkaline soils.

Cultivation and uses
There is evidence of its use about 2000 years ago by the ancient Romans and Greeks.

Winter savory is easy to grow and can be used as a culinary herb garden edging plant. It requires six hours of sun per day and well-draining soil. In temperate climates it becomes dormant in winter, putting out leaves on the bare stems in the spring. While dormant, it should not be cut back; stems which appear dead will leaf-out again. Winter savory is hardy and has a low-bunching habit.

It is hardy to USDA Zone 4 and can be propagated from softwood cuttings. Winter savory is used as a companion plant for beans, keeping bean weevils away, and is also planted with roses to reduce mildew and aphids.

S. montana 'Nana' is a known dwarf cultivar.
S. montana 'Prostrate White' is a small white flowered form.

Culinary uses
In cooking, winter savory has a reputation for going very well with both beans and meats, very often lighter meats such as chicken or turkey, and can be used in stuffing. It can also be used in soups and sauces. It has a strong flavour (stronger than summer savory) while uncooked but loses much of its flavour with prolonged cooking. It can be added to breadcrumbs as a coating for various meats including trout.

Medicinal uses

Winter savory has been purported to have antiseptic, aromatic, carminative, and digestive benefits. It has also been used as an expectorant, and in the treatment of bee stings or insect bites through the use of a poultice of the leaves. The plant has a stronger action than the closely related summer savory.

Taken internally, it is said to be a remedy for colic and a cure for flatulence, whilst it is also used to treat gastro-enteritis, cystitis, nausea, diarrhoea, bronchial congestion, sore throat and menstrual disorders. It should not be prescribed for pregnant women.

Therapeutic-grade oil has been determined to inhibit the growth of Candida albicans.

The plant is harvested when flowering in the summer and can be used fresh or dried. The essential oil is an ingredient in lotions for the scalp in cases of incipient baldness. An ointment made from the plant is used externally to relieve arthritic joints.

In traditional herbal medicine, summer savory was believed to be an aphrodisiac, while winter savory was believed to inhibit sexual desire (an anaphrodisiac). French herbalist Maurice Messegue claimed that savory was 'the herb of happiness'.

References

External links

 Grieves, A Modern Herbal

Lamiaceae
Herbs
Flora of Europe
Plants described in 1753